Bakshi Tek Chand was an Indian lawyer and jurist from Punjab. He served as a judge in the Punjab High Court during the British Raj, and as a member of the Constituent Assembly of India after independence.

Personal life 
He was born in August 26, 1883 in the Kangra district in the then province of Punjab in British India.

Career 
He served as a judge in the Punjab High Court in British India.

After his retirement, he was elected to the Constituent Assembly of India in 1946 from the province of Punjab. After the Partition of India, he opted to move to independent India.

In October 1947, the Maharaja of Jammu and Kashmir, having released the popular leader Sheikh Abdullah from prison with the expectation of his participation in the government of the state,
appointed Bakshi Tek Chand to frame a constitution for the state. The appointment was on 21 October 1947, one day before the Pakistani tribal invasion of Kashmir was launched, which put a hold on the effort. With the state's accession to India in the wake of the invasion, Bakshi continued to be involved in the negotiations for arranging the state's governance.

Offices 

 Member of Constituent Assembly of India
 Member of 3rd Punjab Legislative Council
 Chairman of Patents Enquiry Committee 
 Judge of Lahore High Court 
 President of Punjab High Court Bar Association.

References 

Indian politicians
Members of the Constituent Assembly of India
Pakistani judges
1883 births
Year of death missing